The O'Neill Brothers are an American instrumental piano duo from New Prague, Minnesota, comprising brothers Tim and Ryan O'Neill. They are also known as Pianissimo Brothers. Their most famous covered songs are Rainbow Connection, Tomorrow (The Sun Will Come Out), Moonlight Sonata, Unforgettable and As Time Goes By, shown on their own and Pianissimo Brothers albums, used for relaxing music for weddings, sleeping, bubble baths, doctor’s offices, winter, Earth Day, Thanksgiving and other stuff, and Silver and Gold, The Christmas Song (Chestnuts Roasting on an Open Fire), Have Yourself a Merry Little Christmas and Carol of the Bells for Christmas albums.

The brothers both began piano lessons at age five and attended the University of Notre Dame before deciding to pursue a career together in 1997. The pair began self-releasing albums, many based on themes such as marriage, Christmas, patriotism, and styles such as traditional Irish music. The group found success selling their music on the television station QVC in addition to making appearances on other networks. Their 2000 release From the Heart saw a resurgence in popularity in 2005, peaking at #21 on the Billboard Pop Catalog chart. The group has sold over one million albums total.

Discography
2000  From the Heart [Box Set]
2002  A Day to Remember: Instrumental Music for Your Wedding
2002  Coming Home: An O'Neill Brothers Christmas
2002  Look Within
2002  Meeting of the Waters 
2002  One
2002  P.S. I Love You
2002  Sweet Dreams
2002  Through the Years
2004  Here Come the Irish
2004  Inspiration
2004  Notre Dame Experience 
2004  On Broadway with the O'Neill Brothers
2004  The Journey
2005   Holiday Music: Instrumental Songs for the Holiday Season, Vol. 1 
2005   Holiday Music: Instrumental Songs for the Holiday Season,Vol. 2
2005   Holiday Music: Instrumental Songs for the Holiday Season,Vol. 3
2005  A Day To Remember: Music For Your Beach Wedding
2006  A Day to Remember, Vol. 2
2006  Celebrate America
2006  Someone You Love
2006  Reflections
2006  Holiday Home
2007  Day Break
2008  Autumn
2008  Harvest
2008  Songs of Faith
2009  Songs of Serenity - Quiet Time, A Spiritual Renewal, and Inspirational Music
2010 Lullabies by Request
2011 Christmas Lullabies
2012 Notre Dame Lullabies
2013 Spirit of Notre Dame [2 CD Set]
2013 Sunday Morning
2016 Instrumental Tribute to Prince

References

American musical duos
Sibling musical duos
Musicians from Minnesota